Magheradrool is a civil parish in County Down, Northern Ireland. It is situated mainly in the historic barony of Kinelarty, with one townland in the barony of Iveagh Lower, Lower Half. It is also a townland of 503 acres.

Settlements
The civil parish contains the following settlements:
Ballynahinch
Drumaness

Townlands
Magheradrool civil parish contains the following townlands:

Ballycreen
Ballykine Lower
Ballykine Upper
Ballylone Big
Ballylone Little
Ballymacarn North
Ballymacarn South
Ballymaglave North
Ballymaglave South
Ballynahinch
Creevytenant
Cumber
Drumaness
Drumsnade
Glasdrumman
Magheradrool
Magheraknock
Magheratimpany

See also
List of civil parishes of County Down

References

 
Townlands of County Down